Polyploca laororshanae is a moth in the family Drepanidae. The habitat of P. laororshanae is located in northern Israel and possibly Lebanon and Syria, although this remains unclear. The habitat consists of clearings and the fringes of evergreen sclerophyllous maquis on limestone.

The ground colour of the forewings is ash-grey, the basal area somewhat darker, and the terminal area a brown shade. The hindwing ground color is a pale brown-grey, and the marginal area suffused with darker grey. Adults have been recorded on wing from mid-March to late April.

The larvae may feed on Quercus species.

Etymology
The species is named in honour of Dr Laororshan of the Entomological Laboratory, Ministry of Health (Israel) for her achievements in medical entomology.

References

External links

Moths described in 2006
Moths of the Middle East
Endemic fauna of the Middle East
Thyatirinae